Bahodirjon Sooltonov (Баходирджон Султанов; born January 15, 1985, in Andijan) is an Uzbekistani boxer who competed in the bantamweight (54 kg) division at the 2004 Summer Olympics and won the bronze medal.

Career
At bantamweight he won bronze 2003 losing to Gennadi Kovalev. He qualified for the Athens Games by winning the gold medal at the 2004 Asian Amateur Boxing Championships in Puerto Princesa, Philippines. In the final he defeated Kyrgyzstan's Aybek Abdymomunov.

Sooltonov won the gold medal at featherweight at the 2006 Asian Games in Doha beating Olympic silver medalist Kim Song Guk in the semifinal and Zorigtbaataryn Enkhzorig.

At the world championships 2007 he lost to eventual Russian winner Albert Selimov and didn't medal.

Olympic Results 2004
2004 (as a bantamweight)
1st round bye
Defeated Andrzej Liczik (Poland) RSC 2 (1:28)
Defeated Andrew Kooner (Canada) 44–32
Lost to Guillermo Rigondeaux Ortiz (Cuba) 13–27, southpaw Rigondeaux scored a knockdown

Olympic Results 2008
Defeated Anthresh Lalit Lakra (India) 9–5
Lost to Vasyl Lomachenko (Ukraine) 1–13

World amateur championships results 
2003 (as a bantamweight)
Defeated Ibrahim Aydogan (Turkey) RSCO 2
Defeated Waldemar Cucereanu (Romania) 21–10
Defeated Han Sung-Moon (South Korea) 37–19
Lost to Gennady Kovalev (Russia) 15–21 (placed third)

2005 (as a bantamweight)
Defeated Mirzhan Rakhimzhanov (Kazakhstan) 26–18
Defeated Zsolt Bedak (Hungary) 41–23
Defeated Kim Won-Guk (North Korea) 36–19
Lost to Guillermo Rigondeaux (Cuba) RSCO

2007 (as a featherweight)
Defeated Jesús Cuéllar (Argentina) 31–13
Defeated Han Song-Ryong (North Korea) 31–8
Lost to Albert Selimov (Russia) 9–24

External links
 2003 world results
 Asian Games

1985 births
Living people
People from Andijan
Bantamweight boxers
Olympic boxers of Uzbekistan
Boxers at the 2004 Summer Olympics
Boxers at the 2008 Summer Olympics
Olympic bronze medalists for Uzbekistan
Olympic medalists in boxing
Asian Games medalists in boxing
Boxers at the 2006 Asian Games
Medalists at the 2004 Summer Olympics
Uzbekistani male boxers
AIBA World Boxing Championships medalists
Asian Games gold medalists for Uzbekistan

Medalists at the 2006 Asian Games